C41 is a secondary route in Namibia that runs from Outapi to Oshakati. The C41 diverges from C46, the direct route between Outapi to Oshakati, to incorporate the villages of Tsandi and Okahao.

References 

Roads in Namibia